Andreea Ştefănescu (born 13 December 1993 in Iaşi) is a Romanian-born Italian rhythmic gymnast.

Biography 
She was part of the 2010 and 2011 Italian team that competed at the World Championships that won the Group All-around gold medal. Her teammates also won a pair of bronze medals at the 2012 World Cup Final in 5 Balls and 3 Ribbons + 2 Hoops. She has won a bronze medal at the 2012 Summer Olympics in the group all-around event together with other team members (Elisa Blanchi, Marta Pagnini, Elisa Santoni, Anzhelika Savrayuk, Romina Laurito).

Orders
  CONI: Golden Collar of Sports Merit: Collare d'Oro al Merito Sportivo: 2012

 5th Class/Knight: Cavaliere Ordine al Merito della Repubblica Italiana: 2013

Detailed Olympic results

References

External links
 
 
 
 

Living people
Italian rhythmic gymnasts
Olympic gymnasts of Italy
Olympic bronze medalists for Italy
Olympic medalists in gymnastics
Gymnasts at the 2012 Summer Olympics
1993 births
Medalists at the 2012 Summer Olympics
Italian people of Romanian descent
Medalists at the Rhythmic Gymnastics World Championships
Medalists at the Rhythmic Gymnastics European Championships
European Games competitors for Italy
Gymnasts at the 2015 European Games
Gymnasts of Centro Sportivo Aeronautica Militare
Naturalised citizens of Italy